Gina La Piana (born 1978 in Brooklyn, New York) is a Latina actress and pop singer.

Filmography

Discography
 Giana La Piana (2007) note: online only album

References

External links
 Gina La Piana on Myspace
 

1978 births
Living people
Hispanic and Latino American actresses
Musicians from Brooklyn
Actresses from New York City
American film actresses
American television actresses
21st-century American singers
21st-century American actresses